Horned pansy is a name used for some plants in the genus Viola:

 Viola cornuta
 Viola × williamsii